Georges Poffé (1931 – 20 October 1994) was a Belgian equestrian. He competed in two events at the 1956 Summer Olympics.

References

1931 births
1994 deaths
Belgian male equestrians
Olympic equestrians of Belgium
Equestrians at the 1956 Summer Olympics
Place of birth missing
20th-century Belgian people